Family Dinner – Volume 1 is an album by the American jazz fusion group Snarky Puppy that was released in 2013.

On January 26, 2014, Snarky Puppy and Lalah Hathaway won a Grammy Award in the Best R&B Performance category for their rendition of the Brenda Russell song "Something".

The album was recorded and filmed in the Shaftman Performance Hall at Jefferson Center in Roanoke, Virginia in March 2013. The intent was to draw attention to the Jefferson Center's non-profit arts organization. A portion of sales supports the Music Lab at Jefferson Center.

Track listing

DVD bonus tracks
(On the DVD set, Track #8 on the LP is the first track on the second disc.)

Personnel
Snarky Puppy
Michael League – bass guitar, keyboard bass, acoustic guitar, baritone guitar 
Mike Maher – trumpet, flugelhorn 
Jay Jennings – trumpet, flugelhorn 
Chris Bullock – tenor saxophone, flute, bass clarinet 
Bob Lanzetti – electric, acoustic and baritone guitars 
Mark Lettieri – electric, acoustic and baritone guitars, bass guitar 
Cory Henry – piano, keyboards
Bill Laurance – piano, keyboards
Robert "Sput" Searight – drums 
Nate Werth – percussion
Katya Diaz – backing vocals  
Rachella Searight – backing vocals
Chelsea West – backing vocals

Additional personnel
Jayna Brown – vocals on track 15
Chantae Cann – vocals on tracks 1 & 9
Magda Giannikou – vocals, accordion on tracks 4 & 19
Lalah Hathaway – vocals on track 5
Judi Jackson – vocals on track 14
N'Dambi – vocals on track 3 
Tony Scherr – vocals, guitar on tracks 7 & 11
Shayna Steele – vocals on track 2
Malika Tirolien – vocals on tracks 8 & 13
Lucy Woodward – vocals on tracks 6 & 12

References

2014 albums
Snarky Puppy albums
GroundUPmusic albums